The Kabylia football team is the team representing the Kabyle people, who live in Kabylia. They are not affiliated with FIFA or CAF, and therefore cannot compete for the FIFA World Cup or the Africa Cup of Nations.

Kabylia have played in the 2018 ConIFA World Football Cup qualification.

Current squad
The following players were called up for the 2018 ConIFA World Football Cup.

Notable players

  Nadjim Bouabbas - national team top scorer

References 

CONIFA member associations
African national and official selection-teams not affiliated to FIFA
Kabylie national football team
Kabylie